Lindon is both a surname and a given name. Notable people with the name include:

Surname
J. A. Lindon, palindromist and poet
Raymond Lindon, French magistrat. Lindon served for thirty years as mayor of the Norman town of Etretat
Richard Lindon, one of the creators of rugby
Vincent Lindon, French actor
Albert Lindon, British soccer player
Alfred Lindon, businessman and art collector
Patrick Lindon, Swiss industrial designer

Given name
Lindon Crow,  American football player
Lindon Meikle (born 1988), English professional footballer
Lindon Wallace Bates, American civil engineer